Yewa North (formerly  Egbado North) is a Local Government Area in the west of Ogun State, Nigeria bordering the Republic of Benin. Its headquarters are in the town of Aiyetoro (or Ayetoro) at in the north-east of the Area.

It has an area of 2,087 km. Among the twenty Local Governments in Ogun state, it has the largest expanse of  land with a size of 200,213.5 hectares and it has a population of 281,826 at the 2006 census.

The postal code of the area is 111.
Yewa North has 11 wards namely: Ayetoro Ward I,Ayetoro Ward II, Idofi Ward, Sunwa Ward, Ijoun Ward, Eggua Ward, Ohunbe Ward, Igbogila/Ibese Ward, Joga-Orile/Ibooro Ward, and Imasai Ward.

References
2. Yewa North Historical Backgrounds Ogun State Biz - Retrieved 2021-02-20

Local Government Areas in Ogun State
Benin–Nigeria border crossings
Local Government Areas in Yorubaland